Frank Willem Drost (born 22 March 1963) is a former freestyle and butterfly swimmer from the Netherlands who competed at the 1984 and 1988 Summer Olympics. His best individual Olympic result came in 1984, when he finished in sixth place (1:51.62) in the 200 m freestyle.

His elder brother Peter was also a swimmer. They are not related to Monique. Drost won two bronze medals at the 1985 European Championships in Sofia, Bulgaria. Nationally, he collected five titles in 1987 and 1988, in 100 m and 200 m butterfly and 200 m freestyle. Between 1982 and 1986 he set 15 records in 200–1500 m freestyle, 200 m butterfly and 4×100 m freestyle relay.

References

1963 births
Living people
Olympic swimmers of the Netherlands
Dutch male freestyle swimmers
Dutch male butterfly swimmers
Swimmers at the 1984 Summer Olympics
Swimmers at the 1988 Summer Olympics
Sportspeople from Amersfoort
European Aquatics Championships medalists in swimming
Universiade medalists in swimming
Universiade gold medalists for the Netherlands
Medalists at the 1987 Summer Universiade
20th-century Dutch people